In the final, Peng Shuai and Sun Tiantian beat the defending champions Chan Yung-jan and Chuang Chia-jung to win their title 6–4, 5–7, 10–8.

Doubles results

Seeds

Draw

References

2008 WTA Tour
Bangalore Open